RCA Nashville is an American country music record label based in Nashville, Tennessee. It is distributed by Sony Music Nashville which is part of Sony Music.

Current artists
Kane Brown
Andrew Jannakos
Corey Kent
Niko Moon (RCA/River House)
Pistol Annies
Restless Road
Rachel Wammack
Chris Young

Formerly on RCA Nashville

Alabama
Deborah Allen
Eddy Arnold
Chet Atkins
Baillie & the Boys
David Ball
Bobby Bare
Jeff Bates
Matraca Berg
Clint Black
Catherine Britt
Garth Brooks
Jim Ed Brown
Tracy Byrd
Helen Cornelius
Paul Craft
Gail Davies
Skeeter Davis
John Denver
Dean Dillon
Ty England
Sara Evans
Leon Everette
Family Brown
Ray Price  (RCA/Dimension)
Foster & Lloyd
Keith Gattis
Vince Gill 
Danny Gokey
Andy Griggs
Gus Hardin
Mike Henderson
Becky Hobbs
Ryan Hurd (Moved To Arista Nashville)
Waylon Jennings
George Jones
Steve Dorff
The Judds 
Kristen Kelly
Miranda Lambert
Aaron Lines
Eddie London
Brice Long
Love and Theft
Lauren Lucas
Louise Mandrell
Jim Lauderdale
Martina McBride
Coley McCabe
Pake McEntire
Ronnie Milsap
Lorrie Morgan
Juice Newton
The Oak Ridge Boys
Jamie O'Hara
Old Dominion (Moved To Arista Nashville)
Robert Ellis Orrall
Jake Owen
The Osborn Sisters
K.T. Oslin 
Paul Overstreet
Dolly Parton
John Pierce
Bobby Pinson 
Charley Pride
Eddie Rabbitt
Eddy Raven
Jerry Reed
Jim Reeves
Restless Heart
Kenny Rogers 
Crystal Shawanda
Shenandoah
Connie Smith
Joanna Smith
Hank Snow
Jo-El Sonnier
Tate Stevens
Jimmy Buffett (RCA/Mailboat)
Tommy Shane Steiner
Larry Stewart
Sylvia
Nat Stuckey
3 of Hearts
Josh Thompson
The Thompson Brothers Band
Mel Tillis
Aaron Tippin
Steve Vaus
Porter Wagoner
Clay Walker
Steve Wariner
Dottie West
Lari White
Keith Whitley
Chuck Wicks
Wild Choir
Don Williams
Trisha Yearwood

See also

Sony Music Nashville
Arista Nashville
BNA Records
RCA Records

References

External links
 Official RCA Records Nashville Website

Record labels based in Nashville, Tennessee
Sony Music
American country music record labels